Willem Janszoon, sometimes abbreviated to Willem Jansz., was a Dutch navigator and colonial governor. Janszoon served in the Dutch East Indies in the periods 16031611 and 16121616, including as governor of Fort Henricus on the island of Solor. During his voyage of 16051606, he became the first European known to have seen the coast of Australia.

Early life
Willem Janszoon (Willem Jansz) was born around 1570 as the son of Jan (but nothing more is known of his early life or of his parents.

Janszoon is first recorded as entering into the service of the Oude compagnie, one of the predecessors of the Dutch East India Company (VOC), in 1598 as a mate aboard the Hollandia, part of the second fleet under Jacob Corneliszoon van Neck, dispatched by the Dutch to the Dutch East Indies. Around 1600 he became the father of Jan Willemsz before setting sail again on 5 May 1601, for the East Indies as master of the Lam, one of three ships in the fleet of Joris van Spilbergen.

When the other ships left Java, Janszoon was sent to search for other outlets of trade, particularly in "the great land of New Guinea and other East and Southlands".

Exploration and discovery

First voyage to Australia

On 18 November 1605, the Duyfken sailed from Bantam to the coast of western New Guinea. After that, Janszoon crossed the eastern end of the Arafura Sea into the Gulf of Carpentaria, without being aware of the existence of Torres Strait. The Duyfken was actually in Torres Strait in February 1606, a few months before Spanish explorer Luís Vaz de Torres sailed through it. On 26 February 1606, Janszoon made landfall at the Pennefather River on the western shore of Cape York in Queensland, near what is now the town of Weipa. This is the first recorded European landfall on the Australian continent.

Finding the land swampy and the people inhospitable (ten of his men were killed on various shore expeditions), Janszoon decided to return at a place he named Cape Keerweer ("Turnabout"), south of Albatross Bay, and arrived back at Bantam in June 1606. He called the land he had discovered Nieu Zelant, or Nieu Zeelandt, after the Dutch province of Zeeland, but the name was not adopted, and was later used by Dutch cartographers for New Zealand.

In 1607, Admiral Cornelis Matelieff de Jonge sent Janszoon to Ambon and Banda. In 1611, Janszoon returned to the Netherlands, believing that the south coast of New Guinea was joined to the land along which he had sailed, and Dutch maps reproduced that error for many years. Though there have been suggestions that earlier navigators from China, France, or Portugal may have discovered parts of Australia earlier, the Duyfken is the first Eurasian vessel definitely known to have done so.

Second voyage to Australia
Janszoon reported that on 31 July 1618, he had landed on an island at 22° South with a length of 22 miles and 240 miles SSE of the Sunda Strait. This is generally interpreted as a description of the peninsula from Point Cloates to North West Cape on the Western Australian coast, which Janszoon presumed was an island, without fully circumnavigating it.

Political life

Around 1617–1618, he was back in the Netherlands and was appointed as a member of the Council of the Indies. He served as admiral of the Dutch Defence fleet. Janszoon was awarded a gold chain worth 1,000 guilders in 1619 for his part in capturing four ships of the British East India Company near Tiku on West Sumatra, which had aided the Javanese in their defence of the town of Jakarta against the Dutch. In 1620, he was one of the negotiators with the English. In a combined fleet, they sailed to Manila to prevent Chinese merchants dealing with the Spanish. Janszoon became vice-admiral, and the year later admiral. Near the end of his life, Janszoon served as governor of Banda (16231627). He returned to Batavia in June 1627 and soon afterwards, as admiral of a fleet of eight vessels, went on a diplomatic mission to India. On 4 December 1628, he sailed for Holland and on 16 July 1629, reported on the state of the Indies at The Hague. He was now probably about sixty years old and ready to retire from his strenuous and successful career in the service of his country. Nothing is known of his last days, but he is thought to have died in 1630.

Records

The original journal and log made during Janszoon’s 1606 voyage have been lost. The Duyfken chart, which shows the location of the first landfall in Australia by the Duyfken, had a better fate. It was still in existence in Amsterdam when Hessel Gerritszoon made his map of the Pacific in 1622, and placed the Duyfken geography upon it, thus providing us with the first map to contain any part of Australia. The chart was still in existence around 1670, when a copy was made. This eventually went to the Imperial Library in Vienna and remained forgotten for two hundred years. The map is part of the Atlas Blaeu Van der Hem, brought to Vienna in 1730 by Prince Eugene of Savoy. The information from his charts was included in the marble and copper maps of the hemispheres on the floor of The Citizens' Hall of the Royal Palace in Amsterdam.

Notes

References
 
 
 
 
 

1570s births
1630 deaths
16th-century Dutch people
17th-century explorers
17th-century Dutch explorers
Admirals of the navy of the Dutch Republic
Explorers of Australia
J
Maritime exploration of Australia
Sailors on ships of the Dutch East India Company
17th-century Dutch colonial governors
Dutch East India Company people from Amsterdam
Maritime history of the Dutch East India Company
Early modern Netherlandish cartography